This article comprises two separate lists. The first consists of primary banjo players and the second of celebrities that also play the banjo.

Primary banjo players
A listing of notable musicians who play the banjo as a major part of their output include:

A

B

C

 Howard Caine
 Elizabeth (Bessie) Campbell
 Gus Cannon
 Bob Carlin
 Gaither Carlton
 June Carter
 Eugene Chadbourne
 Jack Chernos
 James Chirillo
 Bobby Clancy
 Roy Clark
 Fred Cockerham
 Eddie Condon
 J. D. Crowe

D

E

F

G

H

I

J

K

L

M

O

P

Q

R

S

T

V

W

Y

Celebrity banjo players
A listing of celebrities who play the banjo include:

B

C

D

G

H

I

J

L

M

O

S

T

V

W

Y

See also

Lists of musicians

References

 
Banjoists